H. Richard Borer is a former American politician and current nonprofit executive.  He was mayor of West Haven, Connecticut 1991–2005. Early on in his tenure as mayor, Borer inherited a financial crisis in the city that ultimately resulted in the State of Connecticut taking direct control over the local budget. As part of his turn around efforts, Borer reduced the size of the city's payroll by instituting layoffs in the Public Works Department. He was also the force behind forcing West Haven's long time political boss, Harold Allen from his position of power.

During his tenure as mayor, Borer focused on the redevelopment of commercial areas  including a new train station on Metro North line for West Haven, redevelopment of Sawmill Road, Savin Rock Conference Center and public safety with a new state of the art Police Station.

He is currently President of Goodwill Industries of Southern New England in New Haven, Connecticut.

He currently serves as commissioner of the Milford Redevelopment and Housing Partnership.

References

Mayors of places in Connecticut
Connecticut Democrats
People from Milford, Connecticut
Living people
Year of birth missing (living people)